Leonard Vernon Howe (December 10, 1886 – August 30, 1955) was an American track and field athlete who competed in the 1908 Summer Olympics. He died in Los Angeles, California. In 1908 he was eliminated in the semi-finals of the 110 metre hurdles event after finished third in his heat.

References

External links
Leonard Howe's profile at Sports Reference.com

1886 births
1955 deaths
American male hurdlers
Olympic track and field athletes of the United States
Athletes (track and field) at the 1908 Summer Olympics